The 2004 All-Ireland Senior Hurling Championship was the 118th staging of Ireland's premier hurling knock-out competition. Cork won the championship, beating Kilkenny 0–17 to 0–9 in the final at Croke Park, Dublin.

Participating counties

Calendar

Leinster Senior Hurling Championship

Munster Senior Hurling Championship

Ulster Senior Hurling Championship

Qualifiers

All-Ireland Senior Hurling Championship 

Note: * = Provincial Champions, (R) = Replay

Championship statistics

Scoring
First goal of the championship: Damien Culleton for Laois against Carlow (Leinster preliminary round)
Last goal of the championship: Tom Kenny for Cork against Wexford (All-Ireland semi-final)
First hat-trick of the championship: Dan Shanahan for Waterford against Clare (Munster quarter-final)
Most goals in a match: 9
Clare 7-19 : 2-15 Laois (All-Ireland qualifier)
Most points in a match: 39 
Cork 1-27 :0-12 Wexford (All-Ireland semi-final)
Most goals by one team in a match: 7
Clare 7-19 : 2-15 Laois (All-Ireland qualifier)
Most points by one team in a match: 27
Cork 1-27 :0-12 Wexford (All-Ireland semi-final)
Most goals scored by a losing team: 3
Tipperary 3-12 : 4-10 Waterford (Munster semi-final)
Most points scored by a losing team: 21
Cork 1-21 : 3-16 Waterford (Munster final)

Miscellaneous

 The round one qualifier between Galway and Down was the first ever championship meeting between these two teams.
 The round one qualifier between Clare and Laois was the first championship meeting between these two teams since the All-Ireland final of 1914.  Clare were the winners on both occasions.
 The All-Ireland final was, for the first time, contested by two teams, neither of which were their respective provincial champions.  Cork were defeated in the Munster final while Kilkenny were defeated in the Leinster semi-final.
 The All-Ireland final was decided for only the second time in history with both sides failing to score a goal, the first being in the 1999 final.

Top scorers

Season

Single game

All-Ireland Senior Hurling Championships